Margaret Brainard Hamilton (December 9, 1902 – May 16, 1985) was an American actress and educator. She was best known for her portrayal of the Wicked Witch of the West, and her Kansas counterpart Almira Gulch, in the 1939 Metro-Goldwyn-Mayer film The Wizard of Oz.

A former schoolteacher, she worked as a character actress in films for seven years before she was offered the role that defined her public image. In later years, Hamilton appeared in films and made frequent cameo appearances on television sitcoms and commercials. She also gained recognition for her work as an advocate of causes designed to benefit children and animals and retained a lifelong commitment to public education.

Early life
Hamilton was born in Cleveland, Ohio and practiced her craft doing children's theater while she was a Junior League of Cleveland member. Hamilton made her debut as a "professional entertainer" on December 9, 1929, in a "program of 'heart rending songs'" in the Charles S. Brooks Theater at the Cleveland Play House. Before she turned to acting exclusively, her parents insisted she attend Wheelock College in Boston, which she did, later becoming a kindergarten teacher.

Film career
Hamilton made her screen debut in the MGM film Another Language (1933) starring Helen Hayes and Robert Montgomery. She went on to appear in These Three (1936), Saratoga, You Only Live Once, When's Your Birthday?, Nothing Sacred (all 1937), The Adventures of Tom Sawyer (1938), Mae West's My Little Chickadee (with W. C. Fields, 1940), and The Sin of Harold Diddlebock (with Harold Lloyd, 1947). She strove to work as much as possible to support herself and her son; she never put herself under contract to any one studio and priced her services at $1,000 ($ with inflation) a week.

Hamilton costarred opposite Buster Keaton and Richard Cromwell in a 1940s spoof of the long-running local melodrama The Drunkard, titled The Villain Still Pursued Her. Later in the decade, she was in a little-known film noir, titled Bungalow 13 (1948), in which she again costarred opposite Cromwell. Her crisp voice with rapid but clear enunciation was another trademark. She appeared regularly in supporting roles in films until the early 1950s and sporadically thereafter. Opposite Bud Abbott and Lou Costello, she played a heavily made-up witch in Comin' Round the Mountain, where her character and Costello go toe-to-toe with voodoo dolls made of each other. She appeared, uncredited, in Joseph L. Mankiewicz's People Will Talk (1951) as Sarah Pickett. In 1960, producer/director William Castle cast Hamilton as a housekeeper in his 13 Ghosts horror film, in which 12-year-old lead Charles Herbert's character taunts her about being a witch, including the final scene, in which she is holding a broom in her hand.

The Wizard of Oz

In 1939, Hamilton played the role of the Wicked Witch of the West, opposite Judy Garland's Dorothy Gale in The Wizard of Oz, creating not only her most famous role, but also one of the screen's most memorable villains. Hamilton was cast after Gale Sondergaard, who was first considered for the role, albeit as a more glamorous witch with a musical scene, declined the role when the decision was made that the witch should appear ugly.

On December 23, 1938, Hamilton suffered a second-degree burn on her face and a third-degree burn on her hand during a second take of her fiery exit from Munchkinland in which the trap door's drop was delayed to eliminate the brief glimpse of it seen in the final edit. Hamilton had to recuperate in a hospital and at home for six weeks after the accident before returning to the set to complete her work on the film and refused to have anything further to do with fire for the rest of the filming. After she recuperated, she said, "I won't sue, because I know how this business works, and I would never work again. I will return to work on one condition – no more fireworks!" Garland visited Hamilton while the latter recuperated at home looking after her son. Studio executives cut some of Hamilton's more frightening scenes, worrying they would frighten children too much. Later in life, she would comment on the role of the witch in a light-hearted fashion. During one interview, she joked:

I was in need of money at the time, I had done about six pictures for MGM at the time, and my agent called. I said, 'Yes?' and he said 'Maggie, they want you to play a part on the Wizard.' I said to myself, 'Oh, boy, The Wizard of Oz! That has been my favorite book since I was four.' And I asked him what part, and he said, 'The Witch,' and I said, 'The Witch?!' and he said, 'What else?'

Hamilton's stand-in and stunt double for the Witch, Betty Danko, also suffered an on-set accident on February 11, 1939. Danko made the fiery entrance to Munchkinland, not Hamilton. She was severely burned during the "Surrender Dorothy!" skywriting sequence at the Emerald City. Danko sat on a smoking pipe configured to look like the Witch's broomstick. The pipe exploded on the third take of the scene. She spent 11 days in hospital and her legs were permanently scarred. The studio hired a new stunt double, Aline Goodwin, to finish the broomstick-riding scene for Danko.

When asked about her experiences on the set of The Wizard of Oz, Hamilton said her biggest fear was that her monstrous film role would give children the wrong idea of who she really was. In reality, she cared deeply about children, frequently giving to charitable organizations. She often remarked about children coming up to her and asking her why she had been so mean to Dorothy. She appeared on an episode of Mister Rogers' Neighborhood in 1975 where she explained to children she was only playing a role and showed how putting on a costume "transformed" her into the witch. She also made personal appearances, and Hamilton described the children's usual reaction to her portrayal of the Witch:

Almost always they want me to laugh like the Witch. And sometimes when I go to schools, if we're in an auditorium, I'll do it. And there's always a funny reaction, like 'Ye gods, they wish they hadn't asked.' They're scared. They're really scared for a second. Even adolescents. I guess for a minute they get the feeling they got when they watched the picture. They like to hear it but they 'don't' like to hear it. And then they go, 'Ohhhhhhhhhh ... !' The picture made a terrible impression of some kind on them, sometimes a ghastly impression, but most of them got over it, I guess ... because when I talk like the Witch, and when I laugh, there is a hesitation and then they clap. They're clapping at hearing the sound again.

Hamilton played two credited roles in the famous film: Almira Gulch and the Wicked Witch of the West. Hamilton also appears as an unidentified flying witch during the tornado scene, which may have been the Wicked Witch of the West or her sister, the Wicked Witch of the East. If the latter case, this would be Hamilton's third but uncredited role. Only co-star Frank Morgan played more roles (five) in the film. Hamilton and Morgan never share any scenes in Oz. However, in By Your Leave (1934), she plays his housekeeper, and in Saratoga (1937), she has a colloquy with Morgan regarding a cosmetic product he invented (with side glances and eye rolls by Morgan as to its effect on her "beauty"). Hamilton's line from The Wizard of Oz – "I'll get you, my pretty, and your little dog, too!" – was ranked 99th in the 2005 American Film Institute survey of the most memorable movie quotes. Her son, interviewed for the 2005 DVD edition of the film, commented that Hamilton enjoyed the line so much, she sometimes used it in her real life.

A few months after filming Oz, she appeared in Babes in Arms (1939) as Jeff Steele's aunt, Martha, a society do-gooder who made it her goal to send the gang of child actors, led by Mickey Rooney and Judy Garland, to a work farm. In 1945, she played the domineering sister of Oz co-star Jack Haley in George White's Scandals, comically trying to prevent him from marrying actress Joan Davis, even going so far as to throw a hatchet at her. Hamilton and Ray Bolger were cast members in the 1966 fantasy film The Daydreamer, a collection of stories by Hans Christian Andersen. A few years later, they were reunited on Broadway for the short-lived musical Come Summer.

Radio, television, and stage career

In the 1940s and 1950s, Hamilton had a long-running role on the radio series Ethel and Albert (or The Couple Next Door) in which she played the lovable, scattered Aunt Eva (name later changed to Aunt Effie). She appeared in The Phil Silvers Show episode S2E20 Bilko Enters Politics (05 February 1957). During the 1960s and 1970s, Hamilton appeared regularly on television. She did a stint as a What's My Line? mystery guest on the popular Sunday night CBS-TV program. She played Morticia Addams' mother, Hester Frump, in three episodes of The Addams Family. (1965–66; Hamilton had been offered the role of Grandmama, but turned it down.) 

In 1962, Hamilton played Leora Scofield, a suffragette who arrives in Laramie, Wyoming, to bolster feminist causes in a territory where women had already obtained the right to vote, in the episode "Beyond Justice" of NBC's Laramie. 

Having started on the stage in the early 1930s, she began to work extensively in the theater after leaving Los Angeles. She appeared on Broadway in the musical Goldilocks opposite Don Ameche and Elaine Stritch, gave a lighter touch to the domineering Parthy Anne Hawks in the 1966 revival of Show Boat (dancing with David Wayne), and was the tender Aunt Eller in the 1968 Lincoln Center revival of Oklahoma!. Hamilton also toured in many plays and musicals, even repeating her role of the Wicked Witch in specially written stage productions of The Wizard of Oz. For her last stage role, she was cast as Madame Armfeldt in the Stephen Sondheim musical A Little Night Music, singing the song "Liaisons" for the national tour costarring with Jean Simmons as her daughter Desiree.

Even with her extensive film career, Hamilton took roles in whatever medium she could get if she was free, making her soap opera debut as the nasty Mrs. Sayre on Valiant Lady, who schemed to prevent her daughter from marrying the heroine's son. In the 1960s, Hamilton was a regular on another CBS soap opera, The Secret Storm, playing the role of Grace Tyrell's housekeeper, Katie. For ABC's short-lived radio anthology Theatre-Five, she played a manipulative ailing Aunt Lettie to Joan Lorring as the unhappy niece Maude in "Noose of Pearls". In the early 1970s, she joined the cast of another CBS soap opera, As the World Turns, on which she played Miss Peterson, Simon Gilbey's assistant. She had a small role in the made-for-television film The Night Strangler (1973) and appeared as a befuddled neighbor on Sigmund and the Sea Monsters, who is a friend of the very similar Mary Wickes. In The Paul Lynde Halloween Special (1976), she portrayed Lynde's housekeeper, reprising the Wicked Witch role, as well as introducing Lynde to the rock group Kiss. When she reprised her role as the Wicked Witch in a 1976 episode of Sesame Street, "the show's producers were flooded with letters from parents saying it was too frightening for children." She appeared as herself in three episodes of Mister Rogers' Neighborhood, between 1975 and 1976, because Fred Rogers wanted his viewers to recognize the Wicked Witch was just a character and not something to be afraid of. Hamilton continued acting regularly until 1982; her last roles were two guest appearances as veteran journalist Thea Taft (in 1979 and 1982) on Lou Grant.

Throughout the 1970s, Hamilton lived in New York City's Gramercy Park neighborhood and appeared on local (and some national) public-service announcements for organizations promoting the welfare of pets. Her most visible appearances during this period were as general store owner, Cora, in a national series of television commercials for Maxwell House coffee. On October 30, 1975, she guest-starred on the radio revival series CBS Radio Mystery Theater. In the episode, entitled "Triptych for a Witch," Hamilton played the title role.

Her Gramercy Park neighbor Sybil Daneman reported that Hamilton loved children but they were often afraid to meet her because of her portrayal of the Wicked Witch of the West in The Wizard of Oz. Daneman's nephew refused to meet Hamilton because even though he understood she was an actress, he thought it was still possible she really was like the character in the movie.

In 1973, Hamilton produced the stage production of An Evening with the Bourgeoisie. Her other mid-1970s stage productions, as the producer, were The Three Sisters and House Party.

Personal life
She married Paul Boynton Meserve on June 13, 1931, and made her debut on the New York City stage the following year. While her acting career developed, her marriage began to fail; the couple divorced in 1938. They had one son, Hamilton Wadsworth Meserve, whom she raised on her own. She had three grandchildren, Christopher, Scott, and Margaret. Hamilton never remarried.

Hamilton remained a lifelong friend of The Wizard of Oz castmate Ray Bolger (the scarecrow). Hamilton was a regular parishioner of the Presbyterian church. A Republican, she supported the campaign of Dwight Eisenhower during the 1952 presidential election.

Final years and death
Hamilton's early experience as a teacher fueled a lifelong interest in educational issues. She served on the Beverly Hills Board of Education from 1948 to 1951 and was a Sunday school teacher during the 1950s. She lived in Manhattan for most of her adult life, and summered in a cottage on Cape Island, Southport, Maine. In 1979, she was a guest speaker at a University of Connecticut children's literature class. She later moved to Millbrook, New York. She subsequently developed Alzheimer's disease and died in her sleep following a heart attack on May 16, 1985 in Salisbury, Connecticut at the age of 82. Her remains were cremated at Poughkeepsie Rural Cemetery, and her ashes were scattered in Amenia, New York.

Filmography

Film

Television

See also
 Miss Gulch Returns!, 1979 play

References

Further reading

External links

 
 
 
 
 
 
 Margaret Hamilton correspondence and ephemera, 1944-1979, held by the Billy Rose Theatre Division, New York Public Library for the Performing Arts
 Obituary, New York Times, May 17, 1985
 Margaret Hamilton fan site

1902 births
1985 deaths
20th-century American actresses
20th-century American educators
20th-century American women educators
Activists from California
Actresses from Cleveland
American film actresses
American musical theatre actresses
American Presbyterians
American stage actresses
American television actresses
California Republicans
Members of the Junior League
Metro-Goldwyn-Mayer contract players
Ohio Republicans
School board members in California
Schoolteachers from Ohio
Wheelock College alumni